Mark Fields may refer to:

 Mark Fields (businessman) (born 1961), president and CEO of Ford Motor Company
 Mark Fields (cornerback) (born 1996), American football player
 Mark Fields (linebacker) (born 1972), American National Football League player

See also 
Mark Field (born 1964), British politician
Mark Field (rugby league) (born 1984), English rugby league footballer